BNC may refer to:

Science and technology
 Binucleated cells
 BNC connector (Bayonet Neill–Concelman), a type of RF coaxial cable jack
 BNC (software), (abbreviation of Bounced Network Connection) an IRC program functioning as a proxy between an IRC client and a type of computer network proxy redirector
 Biological, Nuclear, Chemical, types of weapons of mass destruction

Businesses and organizations
 Black News Channel, a cable news and current affairs channel in Tallahassee, Florida, US
 Ballet Nouveau Colorado, a contemporary ballet company based in Broomfield, Colorado, US
 BNC Bank, also called Bank of North Carolina, a former bank based in High Point, North Carolina, US
 Banque Nationale du Canada or National Bank of Canada
 Berkeley Nucleonics Corporation, a US manufacturer of precision electronic instrumentation
 Bernama News Channel, a news and current affairs channel in Malaysia, formerly known as Bernama TV
 Bethany Nazarene College, the former name of Southern Nazarene University
 Biblioteca Nacional de Chile, National Library of Chile
 Bindura Nickel Corporation, a Zimbabwe mining company, a subsidiary of Mwana Africa plc
 Banco Nacional de Crédito or Banco Nacional de Crédito, based in Caracas, Venezuela
 Brasenose College, Oxford, a constituent college of the University of Oxford
 Bollack Netter and Co (Bollack, Netter, et Cie), a French automobile company producing lightweight cars from 1922 until 1935
 Telesta Therapeutics, as a former Toronto Stock Exchange trading symbol
 Brand New Congress, a US political action committee
 Bellambi Neighbourhood Centre, a community centre in Wollongong, Australia

Other uses
 Bangalore Cantonment, a railway station in Bangalore, India
 Beni Airport (IATA airport code), in the Democratic Republic of the Congo
 Beth Nielsen Chapman, singer-songwriter and composer
 British National Corpus, a corpus of written and spoken English
 Mitchell Camera, Mitchell NC/BNC ("Newsreel Camera"/"Blimped Newsreel Camera")